The Antonov An-10 Ukraina (NATO reporting name: Cat) is a four-engined turboprop passenger transport aircraft designed in the Soviet Union.

Design and development

Development of a four-engined airliner intended for use on routes from  began at the end of 1955. Inspired by the Izdeliye N (Izdeliye – article or product) passenger version of the Antonov An-8, the Antonov design bureau developed the Izdeliye U ("U" for "Universal"), a four-engined aircraft with a similar layout to the An-8, but with increased dimensions and a circular-section pressurised fuselage. Early in the design process the choice of engines was between the Kuznetsov NK-4 and the Ivchenko AI-20, and despite superior performance the Kuznetsov NK-4 was eliminated and the Ivchenko AI-20 selected, partly due to the Central Committee of the Communist Party of Ukraine which wanted as much as possible produced in Ukraine, where the Ivchenko factory was.

The first prototype flew on 7 March 1957, revealing poor directional stability which led to a taller vertical fin, and later to hexagonal auxiliary fins at the tips of the tailplane. Entering production at Zavod (factory) No.64, Voronezh in 1957, the initial three aircraft were delivered with Kuznetsov NK-4 engines, due to non-availability of the Ivchenko AI-20 engines. From 1958, production aircraft were delivered with the Ivchenko AI-20A engines which boasted a longer service life and comparable performance compared to the Kuznetsov engines. The new aircraft was displayed to the public for the first time in July 1957; the design was approved for mass production after testing was completed in June 1959. Aeroflot began operations with the An-10 from 22 July 1959 on the Moscow – Simferopol route.

Configured with 85 seats, the cabin was spacious and well-appointed with comfortable seats widely spaced, giving plenty of legroom, but due to the low cabin floor and wide diameter, there was much unusable space which limited baggage and cargo volume. The inefficient use of cabin volume contributed greatly to the low payload/TOW ratio which was much lower than that of the contemporary Ilyushin Il-18, but which was still higher than the Tupolev Tu-104. A later production version, the An-10A, addressed some of the efficiency concerns by increasing the number of seats from 85 to 89 and 100 (in the two versions of the An-10A), then to 117–118 and finally 132 through reducing seat pitch and changing the cabin layout. Powered by Ivchenko AI-20K engines the An-10A demonstrated superior performance and an increased maximum payload of 14.5 Tonnes (31,970 lb). The auxiliary endplate fins eventually gave way to improved splayed ventral fins under the rear fuselage. The directional stability was now acceptable and the new ventral fins also improved longitudinal stability at high g and on landing approach, as well as delaying the onset of Mach buffet to M0.702. Due to being sited in an area of flow separation, the new ventral fins also caused unpleasant vibrations. Following results of flight tests and at least two fatal crashes, an effective tailplane deicing system was retrofitted to all remaining aircraft.

Operational history

A total of 104 aircraft were built, including the prototype and static test airframes, entering service with the Ukrainian Civil Aviation Directorate of Aeroflot from 27 April 1959, proving popular due to large cargo volume (when fitted with reduced seating) and excellent field performance, making the aircraft suitable for use on small undeveloped airfields. The Antonov Bureau simultaneously developed and produced the Antonov An-8 medium military transport, the An-10 civil airliner and military paratroop transport, as well as the Antonov An-12 military cargo transport.

On 16 November 1959 CCCP-11167 crashed on final approach near Lviv due to icing.

On 22 April 1962 an An-10A piloted by A. Mitronin achieved a world record 500 km closed loop speed record averaging .

On 26 February 1960, at Lviv Danylo Halytskyi International Airport, CCCP-11180 crashed due to reduced longitudinal stability and control authority caused by icing of the tailplane.

Military use of the An-10 was fairly extensive with 45 An-10TS built for the VTA, 16 flown exclusively by military units and the remaining 38 loaned to the Ministry of Civil Aviation, as well as the flyable aircraft remaining after withdrawal from Aeroflot service.

On 18 May 1972, while descending to Kharkiv International Airport an An-10 crashed, killing eight crew and 113 passengers. An investigation revealed fatigue cracking of the wing centre section stringers on many of the remaining aircraft. Following this accident, Aeroflot ceased operating the An-10.

After withdrawal from Aeroflot service on 27 August 1972, 25 An-10A aircraft which were in good condition were transferred to the VVS (Soviet Air Force) and other MAP (Ministry of Aircraft Production) units, until retired by 1974.

A few examples have been preserved as exhibits in museums, and several have been converted into children's theatres (at Kyiv, Samara and Novocherkassk).

Operators
 
 Aeroflot
 Soviet Air Force

Variants
 Izdeliye U – The in-house designation of the four-engined passenger aircraft derived from the Izdeliye N An-8 project.
 An-10 – The designation of the prototype and initial production versions fitted with Kuznetsov NK-4 or Ivchenko AI-20A engines.
 An-10A – Production aircraft from December 1959 with increased seating, decreased empty weight/increased payload and Ivchenko AI-20K engines.
 An-10AS – Several aircraft modified for small package cargo transport with no seats.
 An-10B (first use of designation) – Version with improved avionics and seating for 118 passengers.
 An-10B (second use of designation) – An An-10A configured to carry 132 passengers. This was achieved by increasing the number of seats in a row to seven and adding two more rows in the middle cabin. Seats in the front and middle sections reclined for passenger comfort. The tail was also modified. Extra fuel tanks were also fitted to increase range. One aircraft built in 1962.
The engines were moved  outward and fiberglass propeller blades fitted to reduce noise and increase efficiency. Production of a prototype was planned for 1960.
 An-10KP – (Komandny Punkt – command post) A single aircraft (CCCP-11854) modified as an airborne command post for use at Sperenberg Airfield, near Berlin in the DDR.
 An-10TS – (Transport/Sanitarny – transport/ambulance) 45 aircraft ordered for the VTA (Voyenno-Transportnaya Aviatsiya – transport air arm), with 38 loaned to the Ministry of Civil Aviation.
Development began in 1963, but the aircraft was never built.
Development began in 1957, but following an order for another variant, the aircraft was never built.

Accidents and incidents
Over its life, the An-10 experienced 15 accidents, with 373 fatalities. The An-10 carried more than 35 million passengers and 1.2 million tons of cargo.

On 29 April 1958, an An-10 (CCCP-L7256) of MAP Voronezh AZ crashed at Pridacha Airport during a test flight following double engine failure, killing one of five crew. Shortly after takeoff, engine number one overheated and failed due to prolonged operation in takeoff mode; the engine control system reduced power to engine number four to avoid asymmetric thrust. Engine number three later overheated and failed and power was reduced to engine number two. With only two engines, the aircraft could not maintain altitude and the crew decided to make a gear-down forced landing in a field, but the aircraft crashed during the attempt.
On 16 November 1959, Aeroflot Flight 315, an An-10 (CCCP-11167), entered a nosedive and crashed near Snilow Airport due to tail icing, killing all 40 on board. It was found that the An-10 was vulnerable in icing conditions.
On 26 February 1960, Aeroflot Flight 315, an An-10A (CCCP-11180), entered a nosedive while on approach to Snilow Airport due to tail icing. Although the crew were able to regain control, the aircraft went into another nosedive and crashed, killing 32 of 33 on board. In the wake of this accident and the crash of An-10 CCCP-11167 in 1959, ice protection systems for the stabilizer were improved and pilots could not select more than 15 degrees of flaps in known icing conditions.
On 27 January 1962, an Aeroflot An-10 (CCCP-11148) crashed near Baratayevka Airport during a test flight after the number four propeller reversed, killing 13 of 14 on board.
On 28 July 1962, Aeroflot Flight 415, an An-10A (CCCP-11186), struck a mountain 13 mi southeast of Adler/Sochi Airport while on approach due to ATC errors, killing all 81 on board.
On 8 February 1963, an Aeroflot An-10A (CCCP-11193) stalled and crashed near Syktyvkar during a training flight following triple engine failure due to ice ingestion, killing the seven crew.
On 8 August 1968, an Aeroflot An-10A (CCCP-11172) crashed on landing at Mirny Airport after the left main landing gear fell off while the landing gear was lowered; there were no casualties.
On 12 October 1969, an Aeroflot An-10 (CCCP-11169) ran into a trench after landing on a snow-covered runway at Mirny Airport; no casualties.
On 15 May 1970, an Aeroflot An-10 (CCCP-11149) lost control and crashed at Kishinev (now Chișinău) while performing a two-engined go-around during a training flight, killing the 11 crew.
On 8 August 1970, Aeroflot Flight 888, an An-10A (CCCP-11188), force-landed in a field 24 mi north of Kishinev Airport following an in-flight fire caused by an uncontained engine failure, killing one of 114 on board.
On 31 March 1971, Aeroflot Flight 1969, an An-10 (CCCP-11145), crashed on approach to Voroshilovgrad (now Luhansk) following an unexplained wing separation, killing all 65 on board.
On 12 October 1971, an Aeroflot An-10 (CCCP-11137), suffered landing gear collapse on landing at Kishinev; no casualties.
In February 1972, an Aeroflot An-10 (CCCP-11142) burned out in a fire at ARZ-412 at Rostov Airport.
On 30 April 1972, an Aeroflot An-10 (CCCP-11159) suffered severe damage after a heavy landing at Vnukovo Airport; no casualties.
On 18 May 1972, Aeroflot Flight 1491, an An-10A (CCCP-11215), crashed on approach to Kharkov Airport after both wings separated due to fatigue failure in the center wing panel, killing all 122 on board. Aeroflot retired the An-10 following this accident.

Specifications (An-10A)

See also

References

Further reading

External links

An-010
1950s Soviet airliners
Four-engined tractor aircraft
High-wing aircraft
Four-engined turboprop aircraft
Aircraft first flown in 1957